The Brit Award for International Group is an award given by the British Phonographic Industry (BPI), an organisation which represents record companies and artists in the United Kingdom. The accolade is presented at the Brit Awards, an annual celebration of British and international music. The winners and nominees are determined by the Brit Awards voting academy with over one-thousand members, which comprise record labels, publishers, managers, agents, media, and previous winners and nominees.

The inaugural recipients of the award were Huey Lewis and the News in 1986. U2 hold the record for most wins in the category, with five, while The Black Eyed Peas and First Aid Kit share the record for most nominations without a win, with three. To date, four female groups (The Bangles, TLC, Destiny's Child and Haim) have won the award, though six additional groups (Fugees, The Corrs, The White Stripes, Scissor Sisters, Arcade Fire and The Carters) also include female members. The current holder of the award is Fontaines D.C., who won in 2023.

History
Although the award was first presented in 1986 as International Group, the Brit Award for International Artist (featuring groups and solo artists as nominees) was presented prior to the creation of this category and was won by American groups Kid Creole and the Coconuts and The Revolution in 1983 and 1985 respectively. The award was not handed out in 2010 but was reinstated in 2011. The award was not presented at the 2020 Brit Awards but returned for the 2021 Brit Awards.

Throughout the tenure of the category, artists from the United States have won twenty-three times, more than groups from any other country. Groups from Ireland have won six times and groups from Australia have won three times. Groups from Canada and France have won once. Dave Grohl, Jay-Z and Beyoncé are the only artists to be nominated for work in different groups (Grohl for Nirvana and Foo Fighters, Beyonce for Destiny's Child and The Carters, Jay-Z as part of a duo with Kanye West and the aforementioned The Carters).

Winners and nominees

Multiple nominations and awards

Awards by country

Notes
 Scissor Sisters (2005) also won Brit Award for International Breakthrough Act

References

Brit Awards
Awards established in 1986
Awards established in 2011
Awards disestablished in 2009